Ashley Jackson may refer to:

 Ashley Jackson (artist) (born 1940), English landscape watercolourist
 Ashley Jackson (historian) (born 1971), British historian and senior lecturer
 Ashley Jackson (field hockey) (born 1987), English field hockey player